On the Origin of Species published.
Copenhagen Zoo founded by Niels Kjærbølling.
Henry Baker Tristram and Osbert Salvin publishes Characters of apparently new species of Birds collected in the great Desert of the Sahara, southwards of Algeria, and Tunis in the first volume of Ibis.
Thomas Henry Huxley describes the fossil penguin Palaeeudyptes.
Jean Cabanis and Ferdinand Heine publish 
Emile Blanchard Recherches sur les caractères ostéologiques des oiseaux appliqués à la classification naturelle de ces animaux Annales des Sciences Naturelles., t. XI, 1859 online BHL
Birds described in 1859 include one-colored becard, rufous-fronted wood quail, Tristram's warbler, chestnut-crowned foliage-gleaner, and yellow-bellied warbler.
Foundation of Museum of Comparative Zoology.
The Ibis commences
Expeditions

1857–1860 SMS Novara Ornithology directed by  Johann Zelebor.

Ongoing events
John Gould The birds of Australia; Supplement 1851–69. 1 vol. 81 plates; Artists: J. Gould and H. C. Richter; Lithographer: H. C. Richter
John Gould The birds of Asia; 1850-83 7 vols. 530 plates, Artists: J. Gould, H. C. Richter, W. Hart and J. Wolf; Lithographers:H. C. Richter and W. Hart

References

Bird
Birding and ornithology by year